Litsea auriculata is a species of plant in the family Lauraceae. It is endemic to China.  It is threatened by habitat loss.

References

Flora of China
auriculata
Near threatened plants
Taxonomy articles created by Polbot